Jon Johansson is a New Zealand political scientist and the former chief of staff for New Zealand First. His academic specialties are New Zealand and American politics, as well as political leadership. He lectured these subjects at Victoria University of Wellington.

Career
Johansson earned his BA (Psychology/Political Science), BA(Hons), and PhD at Victoria University of Wellington. As an undergraduate, he was awarded the K. J. Scott Memorial Prize for best political science or international relations BA student in 1996 (joint) and the Alan Robinson Memorial Prize for best political science or international relations honours student in 1996 (joint). His PhD dissertation "seeks to extend our theoretical understanding of political leadership by constructing an Integrated Political Leadership Model, one that introduces a diverse range of essential leadership ideas into the New Zealand literature." For this thesis Johansson was awarded the Sir Desmond Todd Memorial Prize. He went on to become a senior lecturer in comparative politics at Victoria University. In 2009, he spent the fall semester in Washington, D.C. as a Fulbright Visiting Scholar to Georgetown University.

Johansson also appeared as television political analyst, most especially during Election Day coverage of both New Zealand and the United States. A 2012 column by Thomas Friedman, Elephants Down Under featured Johansson's political musings.

Following the 2017 New Zealand general election it was announced that Johansson would serve as the chief of staff for New Zealand First, succeeding David Broome. This announcement was met with surprise, including from political commentator Bryce Edwards and Sir Bob Jones.

Scholarship

Orewa Speech
Johansson published a criticism of the Orewa Speech, which was delivered by Don Brash, the then-Leader of the Opposition: "Whether intended or not, the Orewa speech reinforced the ignorant and racist stereotype that Māori were 'savages' before the 'gift' of European civilisation was visited upon them."

Politics of Possibility
Johansson published The Politics of Possibility: Leadership in Changing Times in 2009. In this monograph, Johansson attempts to discern if there are cycles in New Zealand politics. Drawing on the scholarship of Arthur Schlesinger Jr. and Erwin C. Hargrove, Johansson articulates three types of periods in New Zealand politics: preparation, achievement and consolidation. Johansson categorised the Prime Ministers of New Zealand:

Johansson also argued that there have been four transformative epochs in New Zealand political history. The first was the centralisation of government under Julius Vogel. The second was the emergence of an "active and fair state" under the Liberal administration of John Ballance and Richard Seddon. The third was the establishment of a comprehensive welfare state under the First Labour Government. The fourth was the monumental economic reforms  under the Fourth Labour Government.

References

Living people
New Zealand political scientists
Year of birth missing (living people)
New Zealand First